Gorka Arrizabalaga Aguirre (born 14 April 1977) is a former professional cyclist from the Spanish Basque Country.

References

External links

1977 births
Living people
Spanish male cyclists
People from Durangaldea
Sportspeople from Biscay
Cyclists from the Basque Country (autonomous community)